In the Canadian tax system the term Adjusted cost base (ACB) refers to the cost of an investment adjusted for several tax-related items including acquisition costs. It is used in the calculation of capital gains or losses.

Calculation 

For Stocks, Mutual Funds and Bonds:

ACB can also be presented as ACB/unit:

Note: Additional contributions includes any reinvested distributions.

An increase in the ACB will reduce the amount of capital gains realized at time of disposition. Mutual fund front end or deferred sales charges are treated like purchase and sale commissions for tax purposes.

For Selling Property:

Capital improvements made to a property are added to the ACB of that property.  Capital improvements generally extend the life of a property and specifically exclude routine repairs and maintenance.

Acquisition costs such as legal fees, land transfer tax, land surveys and property inspections increase the ACB of a property. Interest paid on debt used to acquire vacant land is added to the ACB of the land.

Phantom distributions
An exchange-traded fund (ETF) may choose to reinvest some of its realized capital gains instead of paying the money out as a distribution to unit holders. This incurs a taxable capital gain for unit holders and must be added to the ACB of the ETF to prevent double taxation.

See also

 Adjusted basis - Equivalent term in the United States.
 Canada Revenue Agency
 Capital gain

References

External links
 Canada Revenue Agency Website - Adjusted Cost Base

Taxation in Canada
Tax terms